Kildebakke station (literally, "Spring Hill" station) is a station on the Farum radial of the S-train network in Copenhagen, Denmark.

See also
 List of railway stations in Denmark

References

External links
Official Kildebakke station webpage (in Danish)

S-train (Copenhagen) stations
Railway stations opened in 1935
1935 establishments in Denmark
Railway stations in Denmark opened in the 20th century